Thomas Galberry (May 28, 1833 – October 10, 1878) was an Irish Augustinian friar and the fourth Bishop of Hartford, Connecticut, serving from 1876 until his death in 1878.

Biography
Galberry was born in Naas, County Kildare, to Thomas and Margaret (née White) Galberry. In 1836 he and his family moved to the United States, where they settled in Philadelphia, Pennsylvania. He studied the classics at Villanova College from 1847 to 1851, and entered the novitiate of the Order of St. Augustine, more commonly known as the Augustinians, in January 1852. After making his profession on January 4, 1853, he remained at Villanova for three more years, studying theology, scripture and oratory and serving as a professor and disciplinarian. Galberry was ordained to the priesthood by Bishop John Neumann on December 20, 1856.

He then served as a professor at Villanova College until 1858, when he became pastor of the Augustinian mission at St. Denis Church in Havertown. In January 1860 he was transferred to the mission at Lansingburgh, New York, where Galberry tore down the dilapidated St. John's Church in 1864 and built the new St. Augustine's. He also introduced the Sisters of St. Joseph of Carondelet and founded a convent for them; broke ground for a new cemetery; and established numerous confraternities. 

He was named by the Superior General as Superior of the Augustinian missions in the United States (known as the Commissariat of Our Lady of Good Counsel) on November 30, 1866. In addition to his duties as Superior, in February 1870, Galberry was made pastor of St. Mary's Church in Lawrence, Massachusetts.

He served as President of Villanova College from 1872 to 1876, during which time he erected the center and west wings of the college building and reorganized the course of studies. When the Our Lady of Good Counsel Comissariat was formed into the Province of St. Thomas of Villanova in 1874, Galberry was elected Provincial Superior on September 14 of that year.

On March 15, 1875, he was appointed the fourth Bishop of Hartford, Connecticut, by Pope Pius IX. Unwilling to abandon the consecrated life, he sent the Rome his declination of the appointment on the following April 19, but Rome did not accept and required him to obey on February 17, 1876. Galberry received his episcopal consecration on the following March 19 from Archbishop John Joseph Williams, with Bishops Patrick Thomas O'Reilly and Edgar Philip Prindle Wadhams serving as co-consecrators, at St. Peter's Church in Hartford. He designated St. Peter's to serve temporarily as his pro-cathedral while St. Joseph's Cathedral was under construction. He later laid the cornerstone for St. Joseph's in April 1877.

After Galberry returned from an ad limina visit in 1876, his health began to fail and, seeking rest, he set out for Villanova College in 1878. While traveling through New York City, he was stricken with a haemorrhage and taken to the Grand Union Hotel at the corner of Park Avenue and 42nd St., near Grand Central Terminal, where he died a few hours later at age 45. He was buried initially in the Cathedral crypt; later his remains were moved to the Bishops' Plot at Mount Saint Benedict Cemetery in Bloomfield, Connecticut.

References

External links
 Roman Catholic Archdiocese of Hartford
  Photo of Thomas Galberry, O.S.A.

1833 births
1878 deaths
People from County Kildare
Irish emigrants to the United States (before 1923)
Augustinian bishops
19th-century Roman Catholic bishops in the United States
Villanova University alumni
Presidents of Villanova University
People from Lansingburgh, New York
Roman Catholic bishops of Hartford
Catholics from New York (state)